Friesenbach is a river of Bavaria, Germany at the edge of the Franconian Jura.

See also
List of rivers of Bavaria

References

Rivers of Bavaria
Kulmbach (district)
Rivers of Germany